Leiostyla laurinea is a species of small, air-breathing land snail, a terrestrial pulmonate gastropod mollusk in the family Lauriidae.

Distribution
This species is endemic to Madeira, Portugal.

References

Endemic fauna of Madeira
Molluscs of Europe
Leiostyla
Taxonomy articles created by Polbot